Kamaranka is a small town and seat of the chiefdom of Gbanti Kamaranka in Bombali District in the Northern Province of Sierra Leone.Current Paramount chief is Patrick Hassan Bangura as of August 31 2022

Populated places in Sierra Leone
Northern Province, Sierra Leone